Allohahella antarctica is a Gram-negative, psychrotolerant, aerobic and chemoheterotrophic bacterium from the genus of Allohahella which has been isolated from seawater from the Antarctic.

References

External links
Type strain of Allohahella antarctica at BacDive -  the Bacterial Diversity Metadatabase

Oceanospirillales
Bacteria described in 2008